Annie Oliv (born October 12, 1987) is a Swedish cellist and beauty pageant titleholder who represented her country and ranked as a top-five finalist in Miss World 2007 held in Sanya, China.

Career
Oliv won Miss World Sweden on September 8, 2007, and was crowned by the host Marie Plosjö. Oliv succeeded last year's winner Cathrin Skoog. She completed her upper secondary high school education and one year at the Royal Ballet School.  She has worked as a personal assistant for the disabled in Gothenburg.

Melodifestivalen 2008
On February 23, 2008, Oliv participated in Melodifestivalen 2008, as she played cello during Mickey Huskic entry in semifinal three.  They were eliminated in the first round, ending up seventh.

References

Miss World 2007 delegates
1987 births
Living people
Swedish beauty pageant winners